Woodling is a surname. Notable people with the surname include:

Gene Woodling (1922–2001), American baseball player, coach, and scout
Homer E. Woodling (1902–1984), American college sports coach and administrator
Stephanie Woodling, American opera singer

See also
Woodling Gym